The Iban language is spoken by the Iban, a branch of the Dayak ethnic group, who live in Brunei, the Indonesian province of West Kalimantan and in the Malaysian state of Sarawak. It belongs to the Malayic languages, a Malayo-Polynesian branch of the Austronesian language family.

Classification

Iban is classified as a Malayic language, a Malayo-Polynesian branch of the Austronesian language family. The language is closely related to Malay, more closely to Sarawakian Malay. It is thought that the homeland of the Malayic languages is in western Borneo, where the Ibanic languages remain. The Malayan branch represents a secondary dispersal, probably from central Sumatra but possibly also from Borneo.

Background

The Iban language is the native language of the Iban people, who fall under the general grouping of "Dayak" (i.e. native peoples of Borneo). Previously, the Iban were referred to during the colonial period as "Sea Dayaks". Their homeland is the island of Borneo, which is politically divided between Malaysia and Indonesia; the Iban can mostly be found in the Malaysian state of Sarawak.

The language is mostly taught to students in rural areas with a majority Iban population, including Baleh (Kapit), Betong, Sri Aman, Saratok, Lubok Antu, Pelagus (Kapit), Pakan and Julau. In big cities like Kuching, only a small number of schools teach Iban. This is due to the limited number of teachers who are capable of teaching it. Form 5 and Form 3 students are allowed to take Iban in their SPM & PT3 exam.

Dialects

Iban can be subdivided into different sub-ethnic groups, each of which speak in different dialects. The most formal, intermediate, and working dialect is the Saribas dialect, and mainly Betong and Saratok. Others such as Balau, Sebuyau, Ulu Ai, and Rejang are mutually intelligible throughout the Sarawak region. The exception is the Iban Remun/Milikin dialect, which is still understood by Ibans from other districts. In West Kalimantan, dialects such as Bugau, Seberuang, Mualang, Chengkang, Sebaru, and Dau are more disparate.

Dialect comparison 

Sample phases in Iban Remun
  –  ('I did not see it.')
  –  ('I don't know.')

Phonology

Consonants 
Iban has the following consonant inventory:

Vowels 
Iban has a six-vowel system, with five cardinal vowels plus schwa:

Vowel sounds are nasalized when preceded by a nasal consonant.

Writing system
Although the Iban language is presently written using the Latin alphabet, an Iban syllabary (the Dunging script) was devised by Dunging anak Gunggu, who reportedly spent fifteen years from 1947 to 1962 devising the script. Twenty generations before Dunging, which would represent approximately 400–600 years, an ancestor named Renggi also devised a script, but it was apparently lost in a flood. The Iban syllabary is published but is not widely distributed; efforts by Dr. Bromeley Philip of Universiti Teknologi MARA to promote and revitalize the use of script have resulted in the creation of digital fonts in 2010, called LaserIban. His aim is to help preserve the Iban alphabet in digital form in the modern world. The LaserIban font is available for Windows and Macintosh computers and is completely cross-platform compatible. His work has also led to the creation of a teaching program and the transcription of several traditional folktales.

Grammar

Lexical roots can be expanded by many affixes in Iban, as exemplified here with the verb .

  'chase'
  'chasing/playing with each other'
  'chasing something/someone'
  'to chase'
  'being chased by'
  'being chased by many'
  'chaser'
  'outrun/outpace'
There are four types of affixes in Iban, namely prefixes, suffixes, circumfixes and infixes.

Other examples:

  'love'
  'was loved by'
  'affection'
  'busy'
  'to make someone busy'
  'preoccupied'
  'really preoccupied'
  'give'
  'giving each other' (present)
 
  'gave' (past)
  'will be given' (future)
  'giver'
  'call'
  'calling each other' (present)
  'calling' (present)
  'was called' (past)
  'will be called' (future)
  'caller'

Personal pronouns
Iban has separate words for inclusive and exclusive we, and distinguishes singular, dual, and plural.

Sample

  'for you'
  'for me'
  'for us'
  'my book'
  'my friend'
  'my father'
  'your look'
  'your beloved'
  'our school'
  'for my beloved'
  'for my child'
  'from your mother'
  'from my friend'

Pronouns are primarily put after subjects.

Possessive pronouns

Sample phases:
  'This shirt is mine.'
  'This is yours.'
  'That one belongs to both of us.'

Demonstrative determiners
There are three demonstrative determiners in Iban.

These words can also act as demonstrative pronouns where they can stands on theirs own, replacing rather than modifying a noun.

Example:
  'This is good.'
  'That's ok.'
  'Look at that.'

Demonstrative pronouns
In Iban, demonstrative pronouns are words that show which person or thing is being referred in relation to the location of the addressee to the speaker. There are three demonstrative pronouns in Iban depending on location to the speaker. They can only be used to refer to an addressee (human) and cannot be used to refer to inanimate objects.

Examples:
  'Why is this person acting in such a way?'
  'Where is he going?' (Referring to the second closest person to the speaker)
  'Where is the other (person) one?' (referring to third person which is the furthest from the speaker)

Adverbs

Demonstrative adverbs
Demonstrative adverbs in Iban are closely related to the demonstrative pronouns in Iban grammar.

Examples:
  'Come here (you).'
  'Why are you going there?' (within the sight of the speaker)
  'Let's go there.' (referring to location far away from speaker)

Locatives

Examples:
  'I wait for you here.'
  'I wait for you there.' (not far from the speaker's location)
  'I wait for you there.' (referring to a far place)

Manner
Iban also has a set of adverbs referring to manner.

Examples:
  'I want it to be like this.'
  'Why did you treat him like this?'
  'Try to do it like that.'

Interrogative words

  – Who

  – What

  – Where (Dini and Ba ni also used to ask for specific location)

  – Why ( also used.)

  – When

  – How many

  – How

Examples

Numbers

Family

For extended family in Iban

Example;
 'That is my wife's nibling.'
 'That is my husband's niece.'
 'That is my husband's parent-in-law.'
 'That is my husband's father-in-law.'
 'That is my wife's cousin.'

Days

Example:
 'We'll meet again the third day.'

 'I saw him two days ago.'

Months
The Iban calendar is one month ahead of the Gregorian calendar as follows:

Sample phrases

Bible translation

Genesis 1:1–3

References

Sources
  [Paperback reprint in the 1988 by Penerbit Fajar Bakti, Petaling Jaya. ]
 
 
 
 

Kementerian Pelajaran Malaysia / Jabatan Pelajaran Sarawak /Pusat Perkembangan Kurikulum KPM 2007

External links

Digitized books about Iban at the SOAS library
Ator Sambiang Mass Baru: The Holy Eucharist in Iban (1980) Anglican eucharistic liturgy digitized by Richard Mammana

Agglutinative languages
Languages of Brunei
Languages of Malaysia
Languages of Indonesia
Ibanic languages